CAE Inc. (formerly Canadian Aviation Electronics) is a Canadian manufacturer of simulation technologies, modelling technologies and training services to airlines, aircraft manufacturers, healthcare specialists, and defence customers.  CAE was founded in 1947, and has manufacturing operations and training facilities in 35 countries. In 2017, the company's annual revenue was CAD $2.705 billion.

Flight simulators

CAE sells flight simulators and training devices to airlines, aircraft manufacturers and training centres. It licenses its simulation software to various market segments and has a professional services division.

The simulators include basic training devices CAE 400XR and CAE 500XR, and full-motion products such as the CAE 3000, CAE 5000 and CAE 7000XR. These simulators are available for commercial use. In 2016, the company sold 53 Full-Flight Simulators.

In 2001, CAE Inc. acquired BAE Systems's Flight Simulation and Training division, formerly known as Reflectone Inc, a publicly listed company founded in 1939, and based in Tampa, Florida. Reflectone sold flight simulators to the military and provided pilot training on its premises.

In 2021, CAE announced the purchase of the Military Training businesses of L3Harris Technologies; the purchase includes Link Simulation & Training which traces its corporate history to the original flight simulators designed and built by Ed Link.

Pilot training
CAE conducts airline pilot training and business jet pilot training in its 50 aviation training centres worldwide.

In the United States, the firm is a supplier of initial and recurrency training for airlines such as JetBlue and non-airline based companies, including charter and cargo operators. In December 2001, the firm acquired Simuflite training centers in Dallas, Texas, and Morristown, New Jersey, which are now called CAE SimuFlite.

In February 2016, CAE Inc. acquired one of its competitors, Lockheed Martin Commercial Flight Training, formerly known as Sim-Industries.

CAE also operates the CAE Oxford Aviation Academy, the largest ab initio flight training network in the world, with a fleet of over 220 aircraft and seven campuses worldwide, CAE Global Academy Phoenix, and Sabena Flight Academy in Belgium.

As of February 2020, CAE also works together with Airways Aviation Academy, formerly known as ESMA in Montpellier, South of France, for training students from Oxford and Brussels.

Healthcare 
In 2011, CAE purchased Medical Education Technologies Inc. (METI), a Sarasota-based company known for its patient simulator, the HPS.

Corporate governance
The CEO, Marc Parent, was named in this role in October 2009. He has more than 25 years of experience in the aerospace industry. Born in Montreal, Parent is a graduate of Mechanical Engineering from Montreal's École Polytechnique and attended Harvard Business School's six-week Advanced Management Program.

In October 2008, CAE was named one of "Canada's Top 100 Employers" by Mediacorp Canada Inc., and was featured in Maclean's newsmagazine.

Publications
In September 2021, with the UK P&I Club and Witherbys, CAE launched a safety publication entitled Maritime Team Dynamics, a safety book comparing aviation and maritime incidents.

References

External links
 

Companies listed on the New York Stock Exchange
Companies listed on the Toronto Stock Exchange
Technology companies of Canada
Military corporations
Companies based in Montreal
Canadian brands
Aerospace companies
Health care companies of Canada
Technology companies established in 1947
1947 establishments in Quebec